Sayyid Abdulwaḥd  is a village in the District of Jabal al Akhdar in north-eastern Libya. It's located 17 km west of Bayda.

References

Cyrenaica
Populated places in Jabal al Akhdar